Stagwell, formerly The Stagwell Group, is a global marketing and communications group. Founded in 2015 by Mark Penn, Stagwell companies operate in four areas: digital transformation and marketing, research and insights, marketing communications, and content and media. In 2020, The Stagwell Group announced plans to merge with its affiliate MDC Partners. The merger was completed in August 2021.

History 
Mark Penn founded The Stagwell Group in 2015. Penn founded The Stagwell Group with a $250 million investment from former Microsoft CEO Steve Ballmer.

In 2017, Stagwell acquired Forward3D, Scout and also acquired Observatory from CAA.  The company also acquired pilot movie testing assets from Nielsen and combined them with NRG, and acquired mobile research assets from Nielsen to form HarrisX.

In 2018, Stagwell acquired Ink and later ReputationDefender. Stagwell also secured a $260 million investment from AlpInvest Partners.

In 2020, Stagwell acquired Seward Square Strategies as part of SKDK, as well as Headliner Labs as part of ForwardPMK.

In August 2021, following the merger of The Stagwell Group with MDC Partners, Stagwell formed Stagwell Media Network, a group of multichannel agencies.

In July 2022, Stagwell acquired Apollo Program, an AI-powered SaaS platform.

Merger with MDC Partners 
MDC Partners was a publicly-traded advertising and media holding company based in New York. MDC Partners historically acquired majority stakes in partner agencies, and as of 2021 had more than 50 partner firms worldwide.  In 2019, Stagwell invested $100 million into MDC Partners.  Stagwell CEO Mark Penn was then appointed CEO of MDC Partners. On December 21, 2020, the firms announced their intent to merge. On August 23, 2021, Stagwell announced the completion of the merger and the creation of Stagwell Inc. (NASDAQ: STGW) as the merged entity. Mark Penn will continue as Chairman and CEO of the combined company. The merged company will be headquartered in New York, with significant offices in Washington, DC.

References 

Companies based in Washington, D.C.
Marketing companies of the United States
Public relations companies of the United States